One of the Thimble Islands, High Island once served as a hideout for famed pirate Captain Kidd. Kidd's Harbor on the island, as well as nearby Kidd's Island, were named for him. Money Island was named for the legend that he allegedly buried a portion of his treasure here.

References

Wealthy Widow Buying Up Thimbles, "New Haven Register", January 22, 2006, page A1
Half a Mile Off the Coast; Stacey Stowe; "In the Region/Connecticut", New York Times, July 30, 2006; Real Estate page 10.

Thimble Islands